Pirlindole (Lifril, Pyrazidol) is mainly a reversible inhibitor of monoamine oxidase A (RIMA) and secondly a SNRI which was developed and is used in Russia as an antidepressant. It is structurally and pharmacologically related to metralindole.

Synthesis

The Fischer indole synthesis between p-Tolylhydrazine Hydrochloride [637-60-5] (1) and 1,2-Cyclohexanedione [765-87-7] (2) gives 6-methyl-2,3,4,9-tetrahydrocarbazol-1-one [3449-48-7] (3). Imine formation with ethanolamine [141-43-5] (4) gives CID:2838578 (5). Halogenation with phosphorus oxychloride gives (6). Intramolcular alkylation with the indole nitrogen resulted in Dehydropirlindole [75804-32-9] (7).

See also 
 Metralindole
 Tetrindole

References 

Reversible inhibitors of MAO-A
Antidepressants
Monoamine oxidase inhibitors
Carbazoles
Russian drugs